James Hogan (16 October 1882 – 30 January 1974) was an English football player and coach of Irish descent. He enjoyed some success as a footballer, reaching an FA Cup semi-final with Fulham in 1907–08, but his primary legacy is as a pioneer of the game and as an innovative coach across multiple European club and national sides. He is generally regarded as the architect of Total Football.

Early life
James Hogan was born in 1882 into an Irish Catholic family in Nelson, Lancashire, the son of James Hogan. He grew up in nearby Burnley and received his early education at St Mary Magdalene Roman Catholic School. His father hoped he would enter the priesthood and sent him to study as a boarder at the Salford Diocesan Junior Seminary St Bede's College, Manchester in September 1896. Hogan graduated at midsummer 1900 after deciding not to pursue his vocation any further, although he was College Head Boy in the 1899–1900 Academic Year.

Playing career
Hogan was a promising young inside forward, and in 1903, he was the first signing of Burnley's new secretary-manager, Spen Whittaker. Despite being a first team regular, he felt undervalued and in 1905, he asked to be paid the maximum wage, which was £4 a week. The club turned it down, so he left and joined Fulham. Hogan helped Fulham reach the FA Cup semi-final in 1907–08 before joining Swindon Town and then Bolton Wanderers. During a pre-season tour Bolton beat Dutch club FC Dordrecht 10–0; Hogan vowed to return to Dordrecht in order to "teach those fellows how to play properly".

Coaching and managerial career

1910–1920: The Netherlands, Austria and Hungary 
In 1910, Hogan accepted a two-year contract at Dordrecht and set about improving the team in fitness and ball control, as well as implementing the Combination Game. Impressed by his methods, the Royal Dutch Football Association recruited Hogan to manage the Netherlands in a friendly against Germany in October 1910, which Hogan's side won 2–1. Due to his success Hogan also briefly coached Wiener Amateur-SV in 1911 and 1912. Upon the expiry of his contract with Dordrecht in 1912, Hogan returned for a final season as a player at Bolton before returning to Vienna to coach the Austria national football team. However, the outbreak of World War I meant that he was interned as a foreign prisoner of war, but was smuggled to the Hungarian border. He moved to Budapest, where he was allowed out of captivity to coach at MTK Budapest between 1914 and 1918. Hogan laid the foundations for MTK's domination of Hungarian football, as they won ten domestic titles in a row between 1913–14 and 1924–25. However, during a brief return to England, he was initially regarded as a traitor for coaching foreign clubs.

1920s: Switzerland, France, Germany, Hungary and the 1924 Olympics
At the end of the First World War in 1918, Hogan travelled to Switzerland and became coach of Young Boys Bern until 1920; he returned to Switzerland in 1924 to coach the Swiss national team alongside his compatriot Teddy Duckworth and Hungarian Izidor Kürschner for the 1924 Summer Olympics in Paris. Switzerland reached the final but lost 3–0 against Uruguay. 

After the Olympics, Hogan coached Lausanne Sports and Dresdner SC before returning to Hungary to manage MTK Budapest again between 1925 and 1927.

1930s: Austria, France, Fulham, 1936 Olympics and Aston Villa
Hogan next formed a partnership with Hugo Meisl in 1931, coaching the Austria national football team to success during its Wunderteam period when it was recognised as one of the best European teams. Between 1932 and 1934, Hogan managed Racing Club de Paris and Lausanne Sports once again before returning to England to manage Fulham from 1934. However, his players decided they did not want to be coached and Hogan was sacked after only 31 games.

Hogan was contacted by Meisl to help coach the Austria national team at the 1936 Summer Olympics, which was hosted by Germany. Hogan's team were initially defeated by Peru in the quarter-final (4–2), however, a controversial rematch was scheduled which the Austrians won by default as the Peruvians left Germany in protest. Austria reached the final but were beaten 2–1 by Italy after extra time.

Aston Villa appointed Hogan as their manager in November 1936, following the club's first ever relegation the previous season. Villa board member Frederick Rinder had witnessed Hogan leading Austria to the final of the 1936 Olympics and persuaded him to return to England. Arriving at Villa, Hogan outlined his philosophy: "I am a teacher and lover of constructive football with every pass, every kick, every movement an object." He won promotion back to the top flight and reached the FA Cup semi-final in 1937–38, but was sacked while in hospital with appendicitis just after the outbreak of World War II.

Post-WW2: Brentford, Celtic and a return to Aston Villa 
Hogan joined Brentford as coach in September 1948, before joining Celtic in the same year. Celtic's chairman Robert Kelly thought that the team's state of decline needed radical attention, and viewed Hogan as an experienced and innovative coach who was capable of reviving the struggling side. Celtic were at a low point and avoided relegation in recent seasons. However, the majority of the players viewed Hogan’s appointment with scepticism and, at times, mocked his methods. Celtic player Tommy Docherty, who later managed Scotland, Chelsea and Manchester United, credited his managerial success to the school of coaching he received from Hogan, however, and declared him to be “the finest coach the world had ever known”. Docherty also stated: "He used to say football was like a Viennese waltz, a rhapsody. one-two-three, one-two-three, pass-move-pass, pass-move-pass. We were sat there, glued to our seats, because we were so keen to learn. His arrival at Celtic Park was the best thing that ever happened to me."

Hogan left Celtic by mutual consent in 1950, when Aston Villa asked him to return and take over from youth training and advise manager Eric Houghton. Villa won the 1956–57 FA Cup; Houghton and Hogan had laid the groundwork for Joe Mercer's side. Hogan's apprentices included future Aston Villa, West Brom and Manchester United manager Ron Atkinson, who stated: "Everything Hogan did was geared around ball control and passing. When Jimmy came to Villa, he was revolutionary. He would have you in the old car park at the back of Villa Park and he would be saying 'I want you to play the ball with the inside of your right foot, outside of your right foot, inside again, and now turn come back on your left foot inside and outside'. He would get you doing step-overs, little turns and twist on the ball and everything you did was to make you comfortable on the ball."

Hogan retired, aged 77, in November 1959, but continued to scout for both Villa and Burnley. He later returned to live in Burnley and attended several Burnley home games.

Death
Hogan died in 1974 whilst living with his sister's daughter Margaret Melia on Brunshaw Avenue, Burnley. He was buried with his sister, Ellen Melia and her husband Peter Melia, in Burnley cemetery. Margaret herself died in 1992 whereby she joined them in the same grave. The grave is located next to Jimmy's parents' grave, but does not have a headstone.

In 2021, Peter Briggs and his father Charles Briggs, both members of the Turf Moor Memorial Garden located Jimmy's grave and started fundraising to pay for a headstone. The project was financed by the Turf Moor Memorial Garden, Burnley Football Supporters' Club, the Burnley Former Players Association, Aston Villa, former Burnley directors Clive Holt, Martin Hobbs, Terry Crabb and Barry Kilby, along with Burnley director John Banaszkiewicz. Turf Moor Memorial Garden also mounted a plaque next to Turf Moor within their Memorial Garden.

Impact and legacy
Hogan was directly responsible for the coaching foundations of two of the most influential footballing sides in history — Austria's Wunderteam and Hungary's Golden Team. His legacy created a direct lineage for modern football tactics from Meisl's Wunderteam to the Golden Team of Gusztáv Sebes to Rinus Michels' Total Football to Johan Cruyff's Barcelona to Pep Guardiola's teams; all have the same direct ancestor as Hogan worked with the first two and influenced the rest.

He is widely credited with the revolution in European football that saw Hungary defeat England 6–3 at Wembley in 1953, ushering a new football era. After the match, Sándor Barcs, then president of the Hungarian Football Federation, said to the press: "Jimmy Hogan taught us everything we know about football." 

Hogan believed that passing and possession-based football was the answer, but that it must be founded upon constant passing and movement, and added versatility in his players and increased fitness that would allow them to bamboozle an opponent with the fluidity of their attacking moves.

Helmut Schön, whom Hogan lectured in Germany, stated: “I greatly admired Jimmy and always regarded him as a shining example of the coaching profession. In my lectures to coaches today I still mention his name frequently.” Gusztáv Sebes stated: “We played football as Jimmy Hogan taught us. When our football history is told, his name should be written in gold letters.”

Honours

Club 
MTK Budapest
Nemzeti Bajnokság I: 1916–17, 1917–18, 1918–19, 1919–20, 1920–21

Young Boys Bern
Swiss Serie A: 1919–20

Aston Villa
Football League Second Division: 1937–38

Individual 
World Soccer 24th Greatest Manager of All Time: 2013

References

External links
 Traitor or Patriot: Jimmy Hogan

1882 births
1974 deaths
English people of Irish descent
English Roman Catholics
People from Nelson, Lancashire
Footballers from Burnley
Footballers educated at St Bede's College, Manchester
English footballers
Association football forwards
English football managers
Rochdale A.F.C. players
Burnley F.C. players
Nelson F.C. players
Swindon Town F.C. players
Fulham F.C. players
Bolton Wanderers F.C. players
FC Dordrecht managers
Netherlands national football team managers
FK Austria Wien managers
MTK Budapest FC managers
BSC Young Boys managers
Switzerland national football team managers
FC Lausanne-Sport managers
Dresdner SC managers
Fulham F.C. managers
Aston Villa F.C. managers
English expatriate football managers
Expatriate football managers in Austria
Expatriate football managers in France
Expatriate football managers in Hungary
Expatriate football managers in the Netherlands
Expatriate football managers in Switzerland
English expatriate sportspeople in Austria
English expatriate sportspeople in France
English expatriate sportspeople in Hungary
English expatriate sportspeople in the Netherlands
English expatriate sportspeople in Switzerland
Racing Club de France Football managers
Brentford F.C. non-playing staff
Celtic F.C. non-playing staff